Amin Ahmed Adel Youssef (born 14 August 1947) is an Egyptian former swimmer. He competed in two events at the 1972 Summer Olympics.

References

External links
 

1947 births
Living people
Egyptian male swimmers
Olympic swimmers of Egypt
Swimmers at the 1972 Summer Olympics
Place of birth missing (living people)
20th-century Egyptian people
21st-century Egyptian people